This is a list of yearly Midwest Conference football standings.

Midwest Conferencee standings

Early history

Modern era

References

Midwest Conference
Standings